Curculionichthys karipuna is a species of catfish in the family Loricariidae. It is native to the Cassiporé and Jari Rivers in Brazil. The species reaches 2.4 cm (0.9 inches) SL and was described in 2016 by Gabriel S. C. Silva, Fábio F. Roxo, and Claudio Oliveira of São Paulo State University and Bruno F. Melo of the American Museum of Natural History.

References 

Loricariidae
Fish described in 2016